Trichostrongyloidea is a superfamily of nematodes under the order Strongylida.

Includes genera such as Ostertagia, Teladorsagia, Trichostrongylus, Haemonchus, Cooperia, Nematodirus, Dictyocaulus.

References

Strongylida
Animal superfamilies